Padmanabha Nagar Colony is located near Khader Bagh in Mehdipatnam, Hyderabad, India. The colony is located beside the PVNR Expressway and Laxminagar Colony. The colony is famous for Sai Baba, Ganapathy, Shiva, Durga & Hanuman temples (all in one complex) which attracts a lot of devotees from the neighbouring area. This is located near PVNR pillar no. 54.

Neighbourhoods in Hyderabad, India